Harry Christiani (9 May 1925 – 15 November 2012) was a Guyanese cricketer. He played in one first-class match for British Guiana in 1947/48.

See also
 List of Guyanese representative cricketers

References

External links
 

1925 births
2012 deaths
Guyanese cricketers
Guyana cricketers
Sportspeople from Georgetown, Guyana